John Barrington (born ca. 1624, date of death unknown) was an English politician who sat in the House of Commons in 1659.

Barrington was the son of Henry Barrington, described as suffragan bishop of Colchester. He was admitted at Pembroke College, Cambridge on 28 February 1639 aged 15 and was awarded BA in 1643. He was later described as of
Westminster. In 1659, he was elected Member of Parliament for Dunwich in the Third Protectorate Parliament.

References

1624 births
Year of death missing
English MPs 1659
Alumni of Pembroke College, Cambridge